Andrew and Jennie McFarlane House, also known as the William Larimer, Sr. House, is a historic home located in North Huntingdon Township, Westmoreland County, Pennsylvania.  It is a -story, "L"-shaped, log and frame dwelling with cedar siding.  The original log section was built between 1790 and 1798. It has a rear wood-frame addition built in 1870.  At the same time, the house was renovated in the Italianate style. A wraparound porch was added in 1989.

It was added to the National Register of Historic Places in 2004.

References

Houses on the National Register of Historic Places in Pennsylvania
Italianate architecture in Pennsylvania
Houses completed in 1870
Houses in Westmoreland County, Pennsylvania
National Register of Historic Places in Westmoreland County, Pennsylvania